Al-Rusafa or Al-Rasafa is one of the nine administrative districts in Baghdad, Iraq, on the eastern side of the River Tigris (on the west side of which is Al-Karkh). It is one of the old quarters of Baghdad, situated in the heart of the city, and is home to a number of public squares housing important monumental artworks.

Description 
This district is an older area on the eastern side of Baghdad; its central commercial area, a centre of markets considered one of the four old central business districts of Baghdad (Karkh, Rusafa, Adhamiyah and Kadhimiya). It includes many urban features which have become landmarks including Firdos Square and Liberation Square, the biggest landmark in Baghdad and one of the most visited. It has also been home to a number of monumental artworks including the Monument to the Unknown Soldier (1959–2002) designed by local architect, Rifat Chadirji;<ref>Bernhardsson, M.T., "Visions of the Past: Modernizing the Past in 1950s Baghdad," in Sandy Isenstadt and Kishwar Rizvi, Modernism and the Middle East: Architecture and Politics in the Twentieth Century," University of Washington Press, 2008, p.92</ref> a statue of Saddam Hussein (2002–2003) by local sculptor Khalid Ezzat, which was replaced by Freedom by local sculptor Bassem Hamad al-Dawiri, all located in Firdos Square. The Freedom Monument (Nasb al-Hurriyah), a work by architect Rifat Chadirji and sculptor Jawad Saleem is Baghdad's most iconic work, and is situated in Liberation Square. The sculpture of Shahriyar and Scheherazade by sculptor Mohammed Ghani Hikmat, situated on the banks of the Tigris River near Abu Nuwas Street, is another example of Iraqi art featured in the area. Neighbourhoods of Rusafa district include Bab Al-Moatham and Al-Sa'adoon.

 Imam Ahmad Bin Hanbal Mosque 

The Imam Ahmad Bin Hanbal Shrine is a mosque in Al-Rusafah that contains the qabr (grave) of Ahmad ibn Hanbal, a Sunni Imam of Fiqh'' (Jurisprudence). It is managed by the Sunni Endowment Office of Iraq.

Mausoleum of Abdul-Qadir Gilani 

Another prominent shrine in this district is that of the Hanbali Sufi saint, Abdul Qadir Gilani, who founded the Qadiriyya order.

See also 
 List of places in Iraq
 List of neighborhoods and districts in Baghdad

References

External links 
 Public Domain army.mil shots of "Clearing Rusafa"
 Washington Post Article

Imam Ahmad Mosque 
 مسجد أحمد بن حنبل (in Arabic)
 Imam Ahmed Bin Hanbal | Makam of Imam Hanbal (YouTube)
 صلاة الجمعة من جامع احمد بن حنبل – بغداد
 مرقد إلامام احمد بن حمبل في #بغداد

Al-Rusafah, Baghdad
Neighborhoods in Baghdad
Administrative districts in Baghdad